Jordan Zacharie Lukaku Menama Mokelenge (born 25 July 1994) is a Belgian professional footballer who plays as a left back. His older brother, Romelu, is also a footballer.

Starting his professional career at Anderlecht, he made nine appearances for the first team, before joining Oostende in 2013, where he became a regular player. He was signed by Lazio in 2016, making 85 total appearances and being loaned to Antwerp and Vicenza before signing for Ponferradina. 

Lukaku made his senior international debut for Belgium in 2015 and totalled eight caps over the next two years. He was part of their squad at UEFA Euro 2016.

Club career

Anderlecht

Despite interests from Premier League side Arsenal, Lukaku signed his first professional contract with the club, keeping him until 2013.

Having previously trained with the first team in the 2010–11 season, along with his brother (who then left the club for Chelsea at the time), Lukaku was first included in a senior matchday squad on 1 December 2011, remaining an unused substitute in Anderlecht's 2–1 win at AEK Athens in the group stage of the season's UEFA Europa League. His debut came the following 21 March against Zulte Waregem, which saw Anderlecht win 2–1; Lukaku later said after the match: "it was the best day of his life". He totalled six appearances as his team won the league that season, but did not play at all as they retained the title the following campaign, only making the bench twice. During the season, he missed out the start of the season, due to suffering a stress fracture. As he struggled in the first team, he was linked with a loan move to an unknown club in the Dutch Eredivisie, but rejected the move and was sent to the reserve team instead.

On 21 July 2013, Lukaku came on as an 87th-minute substitute for Matías Suárez as Anderlecht won the year's Belgian Super Cup 1–0 against Genk at the Constant Vanden Stock Stadium. After appearing two matches at the start of the season, he announced his desire to leave the club to get regular first team football.

Oostende
Soon after playing in the Belgian Super Cup, Lukaku left Anderlecht to join Oostende on loan until the end of the season. His debut was as a half-time substitute in a 1–0 loss against Lokeren on 31 August 2013. In a match against Genk on 23 November 2013, he set up one of the goals in a 4–0 win. His last appearance for the club came on 25 January 2014 against Waasland-Beveren; he suffered a pubalgia that kept him out of the season.

With his contract expiring at Anderlecht at the end of the season, Lukaku joined Oostende on a permanent basis, signing a four-year contract. His next game was on 1 August 2014, playing his former club, Anderlecht, in a 2–0 loss. Lukaku continued to be in a regular in the first team at Oostende despite being absence on two occasions, including his sending off against Gent on 25 January 2015. In his first permanent season at the club, Lukaku made 30 appearances in all competitions.

In the 2015–16 season, Lukaku set up one of the goals, in a 3–1 win over Mechelen in the opening game of the season, followed up by scoring his first goal for the club, in a 2–1 win over Westerlo, being named in the Team of the Week. He continued to be in the first team until he was absence from late-2015, due to injuries. He  scored his second goal of the season on 31 January 2016, in a 3–3 draw against Mouscron. After returning from injury in early-May, he scored in a 2–1 win over Genk on 14 May 2016. Lukaku finished his second season with 34 appearances and three goals in all competitions.

Lazio

With a hint from the club's president, stating that Lukaku could leave the club in the summer, it was announced on 22 July 2016, he signed with Italian club Lazio for €4 million plus a reported €1 million in performance-related bonuses. Upon joining the club, Lukaku was given a number six shirt and was presented to the club several days later.

Lukaku made his Lazio debut, where he made his first start and played the whole game, in a 4–3 win over Atalanta in the opening game of the season. He continued to remain in the first team until he suffered an injury during an international break that kept him out for a month. It was not until on 27 November 2016 when he made his return from injury, coming on as a substitute in the second half, in a 1–0 win over Palermo.

In the 2017 Supercoppa Italiana, Lukaku came on as a late substitute in a 3–2 win over Juventus at the Stadio Olimpico. On 23 December that year, he scored his first goal for the club, finishing from a Ciro Immobile pass to open a 4–0 home win over Crotone.

Injury problems during the 2018–19 season meant Lukaku only started three games in all competitions before a loan deal until the end of the season was agreed with English club Newcastle United on 24 January. However, the deal was called off the following day after the Belgian reportedly failed a medical.

On 5 October 2020, Lukaku returned to the Belgian top flight with Royal Antwerp F.C. on a one-year loan. On 12 January 2022, he was loaned out to Serie B club Vicenza until the end of the season.

Ponferradina
On 26 August 2022, free agent Lukaku signed a contract with Spanish Segunda División side SD Ponferradina.

International career
After previously representing Belgium at under-15, under-16, under-18 and under-19 levels, Lukaku rejected a chance to play for DR Congo in 2011, in favour of playing for Belgium instead.

Following his impressive performance at Oostende, Lukaku was called by the senior team for the first team. On 10 October 2015, Lukaku made his senior debut for the national team in a 4–1 win in a Euro 2016 qualification match against Andorra; the victory qualified his team to the finals. In his next game on the following 29 March, he replaced Guillaume Gillet in the 59th minute of a friendly away to Portugal in Leiria, and sent in the cross that was headed in by his brother as consolation in a 2–1 loss.

After being included for the a 24-man preliminary squad, Lukaku was selected for Euro 2016 squad, wearing shirt number 21. He made one appearance in the tournament, playing 75 minutes in place of the injured Jan Vertonghen in Belgium's 3–1 quarterfinal defeat to Wales.

In May 2018, he was named in Belgium's preliminary squad for the 2018 World Cup in Russia. However, he did not make the final 23.

Style of play
Regarded as a promising player in his youth, Lukaku is a quick, hard-working, and powerful left-footed attacking full-back. He primarily plays as a left-back, but has demonstrated he is capable of playing anywhere along the left side of the pitch as a wing-back, as a wide midfielder, or even as a winger in an attacking trident. He is particularly well known for his outstanding pace, as well as his technique, crossing ability, physical strength, and stamina, which enables him to cover the flank effectively, get forward, exploit spaces, take on opponents, retain possession, and create chances for his teammates. He has drawn criticism at times from pundits over his tactical sense and the defensive aspect of this game, which have been cited as areas which have room for improvement. He has also struggled with injuries which have limited his playing time.

Personal life
Lukaku was born in Antwerp. His father is Roger Lukaku, who played professional football and was capped at international level by Zaire. He has an older brother, Romelu Lukaku, who also progressed through the youth academy at Anderlecht. Their cousin Boli Bolingoli-Mbombo plays for KV Mechelen.

While at the youth academy at Anderlecht, Jordan, along with Romelu, used to be picked by their father and took them to training every morning. Unlike his older brother, Jordan grew up supporting Arsenal. Around 2012, Jordan became a victim of fake profiling. It came after he was involved in a controversial circumstances, prompting angry response from social media.

In December 2014, Jordan Lukaku was charged with speeding and had his driving license revoked for fifteen days, as well as, being fined €600. The following month, his closest friend, Junior Malanda, was killed in a car crash. Three months later, he was charged with the same offence and was banned from driving for a year. He was given a final warning and told that if he did it again, he would be jailed. The following year, he was charged with the same offence for the third time and was banned from driving for fifteen months.

Career statistics

Club

International

Honours
Anderlecht
 Belgian Super Cup: 2013

Lazio
 Coppa Italia: 2018–19
 Supercoppa Italiana: 2017

References

External links

 

1994 births
Living people
Footballers from Antwerp
Belgian footballers
Association football forwards
Belgian Pro League players
Serie A players
Serie B players
Segunda División players
R.S.C. Anderlecht players
K.V. Oostende players
S.S. Lazio players
L.R. Vicenza players
Royal Antwerp F.C. players
SD Ponferradina players
Belgium international footballers
Belgium under-21 international footballers
Belgium youth international footballers
UEFA Euro 2016 players
Belgian expatriate footballers
Expatriate footballers in Italy
Expatriate footballers in Spain
Belgian expatriate sportspeople in Italy
Belgian expatriate sportspeople in Spain
Belgian people of Democratic Republic of the Congo descent
Black Belgian sportspeople